Archegosauroidea is an extinct superfamily of Permian temnospondyls. The superfamily is assigned to the clade Stereospondylomorpha and is the sister taxon to the suborder Stereospondyli. It includes the families Actinodontidae and Archegosauridae, and possibly the genus Intasuchus, which is placed within the monotypic family Intasuchidae. They were fully aquatic animals, and were metabolically and physiologically more similar to fish than modern amphibians.

Gallery

References

Stereospondylomorphs
Permian temnospondyls
Permian extinctions
Pennsylvanian first appearances
Taxa named by Richard Lydekker